Kosinsky (masculine), Kosinskaya (feminine), or Kosinskoye (neuter) may refer to:

 Kosinsky (rural locality) (Kosinskaya, Kosinskoye), name of several rural localities in Russia
 Kosinsky District, a district of Perm Krai, Russia
 Kosinskoye, Vladimir Oblast, Selivanovsky District, Vladimir Oblast, Russia

People with the surname
 Vladimir Kosinsky (1945–2011), Soviet swimmer

See also
 Kosinski (disambiguation)